"Top Gear: India Special" is a Top Gear Christmas special first broadcast on 28 December 2011 after which the next series began on 29 January 2012.

Introduction
The special is an episode featuring a route across India, one of the many countries Top Gear plans to visit over the course of the new series, according to Jeremy Clarkson. Shooting in India began on 2 October, with the first leg of the shoot beginning in suburbs of Mumbai.

Mission
This episode was a mission to promote Britain to the Indian public. The opening sequence of the show shows the Top Gear team in Downing Street opening a letter by then Prime Minister David Cameron refusing their request to go to India on an official trade mission and told them to go to Mexico for a fence mending trip. Cameron appears for a separately filmed one-line cameo, telling them to – "Stay away from India!" Despite this, they decide to go anyway: Jeremy Clarkson in a 1995 Jaguar XJS, Richard Hammond in a 2000 Mini Cooper, and James May in a 1975 Rolls-Royce Silver Shadow.

Episode

References

India
2011 in British television
2011 in India
2011 television specials